The Salvi are found in the states of Gujarat and Rajasthan in India.

History and origin

The Salvi trace their origin from the word Sal, which means a loom. They are said to have migrated from Gujarat to Malwa in the Middle Ages. The community is traditional associated with the art of weaving. They speak Mewari among themselves.

While in Gujarat, the  Salvi who are also known as the Patliwala or Patua, claim to have been brought from Maharashtra in the 11th Century by the Rajput rulers to Patan. They have been traditionally associated with silk weaving.
As per the census of India, 1921 approximately 6.88 laks sale or salve people were living in Madras, Rajasthan, Hyderabad and Bombay provinces.

Present circumstances
The community speak Mewari among themselves and Hindi with outsiders. They have two sub-divisions, the Marwari Salvi and Mewara Salvi, which are further sub-divided into smaller clans.

With the decline in there traditional occupation of weaving, they are now mainly a community of landless agricultural labourers. A small number are still involved with weaving, and make thick cotton clothes and turban.  The Salvi are a Hindu community, their family goddess is Chamund Devi.

The Salvi of are split into two distinct groupings, the Jain Salvi and the Vaishnav Hindu. Each of these groups restrict their marriages within their respective religious groups. They have exogamous clans such as the Sanghvi, Tapadia, Kapadia, Dhara and Rawalia. These clans regulate the matrimonial alliances. The [] Salvi consider themselves of Vaishya status. Most of  Salvis have abandoned their traditional occupation and are now engaged in a number of trades. As small number continue with their traditional occupation which is silk weaving. The Salvi speak languages

See also

Sadh
Vanzha

References

Social groups of Rajasthan
Weaving communities of South Asia
Indian castes
Social groups of Gujarat
Bania communities